A referendum on hosting the 2024 Summer Olympics was held in Hamburg and Kiel on 29 November 2015. The proposal was rejected by 51.6% of voters in Hamburg, although it was approved by 66% of voters in Kiel.

Results

Hamburg

References

2015 in German sport
2015 referendums
2024 Summer Olympics bids
2015 Olympics referendum
21st century in Schleswig-Holstein
Germany at the Olympics
November 2015 events in Germany
2015 Olympics
2015 Olympics referendum
Sport in Kiel